The Hampton Bluffs are a group of three rock bluffs on the east side of Larsen Inlet, Graham Land, Antarctica. They were mapped from surveys by the Falkland Islands Dependencies Survey (FIDS) (1960–61), and were named by the UK Antarctic Place-Names Committee for Ian F.G. Hampton, an FIDS physiologist at Hope Bay in 1959 and 1960.

References

Cliffs of Graham Land
Nordenskjöld Coast